The 2012 Canadian Rugby Championship was the 4th season of the Canadian Rugby Championship.

The Ontario Blues were the 2012 CRC champions, winning the MacTier Cup for the second year in a row.

Participants

Regular season

Standings

Fixtures 
Source:

See also 
Canadian Rugby Championship
Rugby Canada

References 

Canadian Rugby Championship
Canadian Rugby Championship seasons
CRC